Vogtei is a municipality in the Unstrut-Hainich-Kreis district of Thuringia, Germany. 
It was formed on 31 December 2012 by the merger of the former Vogtei Dorla consists of Langula, Niederdorla and Oberdorla. The closest city and the only one that it borders, is Mühlhausen northerly. Hainich National Park is situated westerly.

Geographical center

See also
 Central Germany (geography)
 For more information please look at the webpage

References

Unstrut-Hainich-Kreis